Xylopolia bella is a moth of the family Noctuidae. It is found in Korea, China, Japan (Honshu, Shikoku, Kyushu to the Amami-Oshima Islsands) and Taiwan.

The wingspan is 38–45 mm.

Subspecies
Xylopolia bella amamiensis
Xylopolia bella bella

External links
Species info
Xylopolia bella amamiensis
Xylopolia bella bella

Hadeninae
Moths of Japan